Michael Lutz (born 25 January 1982) is a German former professional footballer who played as a goalkeeper.

References

External links
 

1982 births
Living people
People from Nördlingen
Sportspeople from Swabia (Bavaria)
German footballers
FC Augsburg players
FC Ingolstadt 04 players
2. Bundesliga players
3. Liga players
Association football goalkeepers
Footballers from Bavaria